Irving Park Historic District is a national historic district located at Greensboro, Guilford County, North Carolina.  The district encompasses 164 contributing buildings, 5 contributing sites, 2 contributing structures, and 2 contributing objects in an affluent planned suburb of Greensboro. It developed around the Greensboro Country Club. The houses were largely built between 1911 and the 1930s and include notable examples of Colonial Revival, Tudor Revival, and Classical Revival-style architecture. Notable buildings include the first Robert Jesse Mebane House, the Cummins A. Mebane House, the Lynn Williamson House, the first J. Spencer Love House, the Aubrey L. Brooks House, Carl I. Carlson House, the Van Wyck Williams House, the Lavlson L. Simmons House, the Albert J. Klutz House, the Irving Park Manor Apartments, McAdoo-Sanders-Tatum House, the Alfred M. Scales House, and the Herman Cone House.

It was listed on the National Register of Historic Places in 1995.

Notable residents 
 Louis DeJoy, businessman and 75th United States Postmaster General
 Bonnie McElveen-Hunter, former U.S. Ambassador to Finland
 Aldona Wos, former U.S. Ambassador to Estonia

References

Historic districts on the National Register of Historic Places in North Carolina
Colonial Revival architecture in North Carolina
Tudor Revival architecture in North Carolina
Neoclassical architecture in North Carolina
Buildings and structures in Greensboro, North Carolina
National Register of Historic Places in Guilford County, North Carolina